The African Banks are the uninhabited northernmost islands of the Amirante Islands, of the Outer Islands of the Republic of Seychelles, in the western Indian Ocean.

History
The islands were discovered in 1797 and named Îlots Africains by Admiral Willaumez commanding the frigate La Régénérée.

North Island had for a couple of months a guano mining camp.

Geography
The African Banks lie about 230 km west of the city of Victoria on the main Seychelles island of Mahé, close to the edge of the Amirantes Bank. The nearest island is Remire Island, lying 27 km south.
The group is a pseudo-atoll, has two small islands, which are gradually undergoing coastal erosion, and appear as just small sandstone ridges exposed only at low tide.
With a shallow coral ring, it appears as an incomplete atoll.

North Island
It has a derelict automatic lighthouse on the north point. and is occasionally visited by tourists in charter yachts. It was formed from sandstone, is almost treeless (one coconut tree in 1995), and covered by grass and low-growing vegetation (shrubland). It is significant as a nesting site for terns, the colonies of which are subject to frequent exploitation and disturbance by poachers.

South Island
It has a small ruin of a poachers hut. HMS Spitfire was wrecked on South Island on August 1801.

Flora & Fauna
The islands, with an associated tract of coastal marine habitat, form a  Important Bird Area (IBA), identified as such by BirdLife International because it supports populations of black-naped (10 breeding pairs) and sooty terns (5000–10,000 pairs), and brown noddies (2000–5900 pairs). green and hawksbill sea turtles nest there.
African Banks are surrounded by coral rim (the eastern side) and waters rich in fish, especially mackerel , tuna and sharks.

References

Archipelagoes of Seychelles
Outer Islands (Seychelles)
Important Bird Areas of Seychelles
Seabird colonies